Le Studio (later renamed Studio Morin Heights) was a residential recording studio in the Laurentian Mountains near the town of Morin-Heights, Quebec, Canada built in 1972 by recording engineer and producer André Perry, Nick Blagona and Yaël Brandeis. The studio, where artists recorded and stayed, was the venue for many notable Canadian and international artists, including Rush (it was nicknamed "Rush's Abbey Road"), The Police, Bee Gees, Chicago, David Bowie, April Wine and Cat Stevens and Vain.  Perry described the facility as "like the United Nations. I had people from London, New York, Quebec, all over the world."

Renowned for its retreat-like location as well as its state-of-the-art equipment, it was one of the earliest studios to install a Solid State Logic  SL 4000 mixing console and RADAR digital-recording equipment. Perry sold the studio in 1988. In 2008 the studio had gone out of business, and as of 2015 the property was up for sale.  On 11 August 2017, the building was partially destroyed by "a suspicious" fire. The entirety of the complex was demolished in 2020.

History
André Perry gained fame as a recording engineer working for John Lennon, and in 1974 was looking to expand his studio, built in a downtown Montreal church. He moved to Morin Heights, where he owned a lake, and built his studio there, with his wife, Yaël Brandeis. The idea was to give recording artists a venue where they could record and live in a creative atmosphere, near the Laurentian Mountains: The Bee Gees, who recorded Children of the World (1976) at Le Studio, stayed for five months. Initially it included a guesthouse about a half-hour's drive away, but it was accidentally burned down by Roy Thomas Baker and Ian Hunter, according to studio designer and engineer Nick Blagona. Later, a house across the lake was acquired and expanded. By the early 1980s it had a reputation as a premier recording venue, after Rush, David Bowie, and April Wine had recorded albums there.

As of December 1980, Le Studio had installed a state-of-the-art computerized Solid State Logic Master Studio System and expanded to 48-track (created from syncing two 24-track tape machines using video interlock). Other upgrades to the studio included the expansion into video work, with the addition of video post-production and editing facilities.

By August 1981, the studio had acquired a JVC BP-90 digital 2-track processor at the choice of André Perry, producer Terry Brown and then-Le Studio staff engineers Paul Northfield and Nick Blagona. It was supposedly first used on a double live LP The Police were mixing at Le Studio that same month, although the André Perry website cites their Synchronicity album as being the one.

In 1986 Le Studio issued stock on the Montreal Exchange looking to acquire funding for building a second studio, with audio and video capabilities, in the US state of Washington. 1.1 million shares valued at $3.50 were sold. Perry and Brandeis retained majority interests. They spent $500,000 on a Quantel Mirage digital video effects unit, hoping to install more equipment to allow the recording of sound effects and film music, as well as a Synclavier room.

In 1988 Perry and Brandeis sold the studio, and Perry retired in the early 1990s. The studio, by then called Studio Morin Heights, was acquired in 1993 by L'Equipe Spectra, an entertainment company best known for the Montreal International Jazz Festival which also had a number of local artists on record. Rush and other bands continued to do their tracking there. The new owners also built a new studio room, called "Far Side", which offered a digital RADAR audio recorder and allowed local bands with modest budgets to benefit from the amenities. The  site was listed for sale in July 2007, with an asking price of Can$2.45 million. The studio was shut down in March 2003 by Spectra. The property remained for sale until 2009, when the land was purchased with the intent to convert the area to a retreat and spa. However, it remained unoccupied, falling into disrepair and was vandalized many times.

A US $2.4 million kickstarter campaign was begun in 2015 to rebuild Le Studio, but only $4,000 was pledged.

On 11 August 2017, the studio's building was partially destroyed by a fire in a suspected case of arson. The residential area of the studio was completely destroyed. The recording area still stood but was severely damaged. Geddy Lee of Rush told the CBC, "it was truly a part of the great Canadian landscape... and literally a home away from home for us. It will always have a special place in our hearts." In October 2020, the remaining parts of the building were demolished.

Other international artists to record at Le Studio include Nazareth, The Police, Sting, Cat Stevens, The Bee Gees, Keith Richards, Kim Mitchell and Bryan Adams. In January 1992 Celine Dion recorded "With This Tear", a song written by Prince and produced by Walter Afanasieff for her Celine Dion album.
 Rush recorded at Le Studio during "the peak and the end" of the Terry Brown era.

Some of the engineering staff included Nick Blagona, Claude Demers, Ed Stasium, Leanne Unger, Frank Opolko, Paul Northfield, Glen Robinson, Robert DiGioia, Paul Milner, Simon Pressey, Jacques Deveau, George Pelekoudis, and W. Le Gallee.

The house and grounds are featured in the music videos of the recording sessions of the Rush songs "Tom Sawyer", "Limelight" and "Vital Signs". The studio is also seen in April Wine's music video for "I Like to Rock."  Also, an episode of Popular Mechanics for Kids was taped there, with Elisha Cuthbert demonstrating recording and mixing techniques.

Albums and songs recorded at Le Studio

Console history 
Source
 1974-1980 Trident A Range, the first of its kind, now in use at New Monkey Studio in Van Nuys, California
 1980-1985 SSL 4000E, Serial No. 11, in use at Tree Sound Studios in Atlanta since 1993
 1985-2008 SSL 4000G sold off in parts

LeStudio Mobile 
First built in 1979, LeStudio Mobile provided recording services for live music and special events. The first truck included a 12-input mixing console and 4-track recording. It was used to record such live albums as Rush's Exit... Stage Left, The Indspire Awards, Hockey Night in Canada and the Montreal International Jazz Festival. The company covered the Juno Awards for more than 23 years, adding a second truck in 2008.

The final large event handled by LeStudio was the Opening, Closing, and Medal Ceremonies of the 2010 Olympic Games in Vancouver.

Through the years LeStudio Mobile evolved with the industry, focusing first on live recorded albums, then audio for DVD productions before moving more into producing audio for live productions while live music productions for HD television brought new business to Le Studio Mobile around 2010, the remote recording business continued to shrink.

As of 2018, Le Studio Mobile had ceased operation. In 2020, the recording area was demolished, and in 2021, the area was cleared and put up for sale for $850,000.

References

Bibliography

External links 
 History of Le Studio on its founder's website

Recording studios in Canada
Mass media companies established in 1974
Rush (band)
Buildings and structures in Laurentides
Quebec music
Companies disestablished in 2001
1974 establishments in Quebec
2001 disestablishments in Quebec
Building and structure fires in Canada